Horst-Rüdiger Magnor (23 February 1942 – 16 February 2008) was a German racewalker. He competed in the men's 50 kilometres walk at the 1968 Summer Olympics and the 1972 Summer Olympics.

References

1942 births
2008 deaths
Athletes (track and field) at the 1968 Summer Olympics
Athletes (track and field) at the 1972 Summer Olympics
German male racewalkers
Olympic athletes of West Germany
Place of birth missing